The Roscommon county hurling team represents Roscommon in hurling and is governed by Roscommon GAA, the county board of the Gaelic Athletic Association. The team competes in the Christy Ring Cup and the National Hurling League. It formerly competed in the abolished Connacht Senior Hurling Championship, finishing as runner-up in the last competition 1999.

Roscommon's home ground is Dr Hyde Park, Roscommon. The team's manager is Francis O'Halloran.

The team last won the Connacht Senior Championship in 1913, but has never won the All-Ireland Senior Championship or the National League.

History
Roscommon's sole appearance in an All-Ireland Senior Hurling Championship (SHC) semi-final occurred in 1910. Tipperary defeated the county by a scoreline of 10 goals to one point.

The county defeated Wexford in the 1984 Centenary Cup.

Roscommon won an All-Ireland Senior B Hurling Championship in 1994 and an All-Ireland Intermediate Hurling Championship in 1999.

The county competed in the newly formed Christy Ring Cup in 2005 and 2006 but was relegated to the Nicky Rackard Cup after poor performances.

Roscommon won the 2007 Nicky Rackard Cup Final, defeating Armagh by a scoreline of 1–12 to 0–13. Roscommon won the 2015 Nicky Rackard Cup, again defeating Armagh in the final. Both games occurred at Croke Park.

Current management team
Appointed October 2021:
Manager: Francis O'Halloran (Ruan)
Backroom: Tommy Guilfoyle (Feakle), Stephen Cusack (Newmarket-on-Fergus)

Managerial history
Michael Conneely Galway 1998–2000

Brian McDonnell 2000

Tom Costello 2001

Brian McDonnell (2) 2002–2003

Anthony Cunningham Galway 2004–2005

Michael Conneely (2) Galway 2005–2006

Dave McConn Athleague 2006–2009

Séamus Qualter Westmeath 2009–2013

Justin Campbell Galway 2013–2016

Johnny Kelly 2016–2017

Ciarán Comerford Laois 2017–2020

Johnny Keane Galway 2020–2021

Francis O'Halloran Clare 2021–

Players

Notable players

Captaincy
Jason Kilkenny: 2021

Records
Anthony Flaherty came out of retirement at the age of 49 to play for Roscommon against Meath in the 2006 Christy Ring Cup. Flaherty had not played competitive hurling for eight years ("about 1998") at that time. Flaherty scored a goal against Meath in that game.

Honours

National
All-Ireland Senior Hurling Championship
 Semi-finalists (1): 1913
Quarter-finalists (1): 1994
All-Ireland Senior B Hurling Championship/Joe McDonagh Cup
 Winners (1): 1994
 Runners-up (1): 2003
All-Ireland Intermediate Hurling Championship/Christy Ring Cup
 Semi-finalists (2): 2019, 2020
All-Ireland Junior Hurling Championship/Nicky Rackard Cup
 Winners (5): 1965, 1974, 2001, 2007, 2015
 Runners-up (2): 2013, 2022
National Hurling League Division 3
 Winners (1): 2007
National Hurling League Division 3A
 Winners (2): 2011, 2019
All-Ireland Under 21 B Hurling Championship
 Winners (2): 2007, 2012
All-Ireland Minor Special Hurling Championship
 Winners (1): 1969

Provincial
Connacht Senior Hurling Championship
 Winners (2): 1906, 1913
 Runners-up (18): 1901, 1902, 1903, 1904, 1907, 1908, 1910, 1911, 1912, 1914, 1916, 1917, 1922, 1995, 1996, 1997, 1998, 1999
Connacht Senior Hurling League
 Winners (1): 2022
Connacht Intermediate Hurling Championship
 Winners (5): 1966, 1967, 1968, 2013, 2015
 Runners-up (2): 1997, 1998
Connacht Junior Hurling Championship
 Winners (13): 1952, 1958, 1959, 1960, 1961, 1962, 1963, 1964, 1965, 1966, 1970, 1971, 1974
 Runners-up (17): 1925 1926 1931 1937 1938 1940 1946 1947 1948 1949 1951 1953 1955 1956 1957 1969 1970
Connacht Under-21 B Hurling Championship
 Winners (8): 2007, 2008, 2009, 2010, 2011, 2012, 2013, 2014
Connacht Minor Hurling Championship
 Winners (8): 1959, 1960, 1962, 1963, 1966, 1967, 1968, 1969

References

 
County hurling teams